The Cans Festival is an annual short film festival held in the parish of Cans (O Porriño, Spain) that coincides with the near-homophonous Cannes Film Festival. The festival is organized by the Arela Cultural Association and coordinated by the scriptwriter Alfonso Pato.

The festival takes over the whole village; Barns and basements change their normal uses to become cinema screens and the audience are ferried by locals to and from the screenings on two-wheel tractors, known locally as chimpíns. Other free activities are also available to the public: concerts, parades and hiking routes.

Background
The Cans Festival is celebrated every year in the parish of Cans (O Porriño, Pontevedra Spain), which has an official population of 400 inhabitants although during the festival that number rises to more than 10,000 people. Its symbols of identity are the peculiar cinema rooms: sheds, basements, empty houses, wine cellars and even henhouses transferred altruistically by their owners who devote themselves to the festival and collaborate in everything they can.

Short film is the genre par excellence in Cans, and every year the festival official section shows the best Galician productions of the season. But Cans is something else than a short film festival: it has documentaries and full-length films premiers, a video clip contest, talks with prestigious filmmakers, presentations of experimental productions like web series, training programs for AV students, etc.

History
Cans Festival was born in 2004, as a kind of joke. The phonetic similarity between Cans (which also means dogs in Galician language) and Cannes was in the mind of some visionaries from a long time ago. In that year they decided to join forces and ideas and set in motion an event that would coincide in time with the glamorous Cote d'azur festival: Cannes. But that was a long time ago and from this funny word game a serious film festival emerged.

Nowadays, Cans Festival is in the epicenter of the worldwide filming earthquake that takes place in May, with or without the consent of its French half- brother Cannes. It has also red carpet and movie stars, but unlike Cannes, here actors, actresses, filmmakers or scriptwriters mix with a heterogeneous public who can easily address them.

Filmmakers, film directors, musicians, actors and actress like Isabel Coixet, Juanma Bajo Ulloa, Fernando León, Manuel Martín Cuenca, Patricia Ferreira, Luis Tosar, Tristán Ulloa, Mabel Rivera, María Pujalte, José Sacristán, Xoel López, Kiko Veneno, Iván Ferreiro, Coque Malla, Javier Krahe, Manuel Rivas, Lucía Echevarría, Suso de Toro, El Gran Wyoming, Teté Delgado, Antonio Durán "Morris", Julián Hernández or Emma Suárez have been in Festival de Cans as guests, rewarded or speakers.

In 2009 it received the Premio da Crítica Galicia, in the section of Cultural Initiatives. In 2011 Pontevedra Provincial Council gave the festival the Premio Provincial á Cultura  in the category of Innovation and Avant-garde. In 2013 it received the Premio Internacional Ateneo de Ourense.

Awards
 Honorary Pedigree Award
 Best Fiction Short Film Award (Jury)
 Best Animation Short Film Award (Jury)
 Best Fiction Short Film Award (Public)
 Best Animation Short Film Award (Public)
 Best Fiction Short Film Award (Locals)
 Best Actress Award (Jury)
 Best Actor Award (Jury)
 Best Screenplay Award (Jury)
 Best Videoclip Award (Jury)
 Best Videoclip Award (Public)

External links
 Official website

Film festivals in Spain
Short film festivals
Recurring events established in 2004
2004 establishments in Spain
Tourist attractions in Galicia (Spain)
May events
Galician culture
Galician cinema